Kurmanji, also termed Northern Kurdish, is the northern dialect of the Kurdish languages, spoken predominantly in southeast Turkey, northwest and northeast Iran, northern Iraq, northern Syria and the Caucasus and Khorasan regions. It is the most widely spoken form of Kurdish.

The earliest textual record of Kurmanji Kurdish dates back to approximately the 16th century and many prominent Kurdish poets like Ehmedê Xanî (1650–1707) wrote in this dialect. Kurmanji Kurdish is also the common and ceremonial dialect of Yazidis. Their sacred book Mishefa Reş and all prayers are written and spoken in Kurmanji.

Phonology 

Phonological features in Kurmanji include the distinction between aspirated and unaspirated voiceless stops and the presence of facultative phonemes. For example, Kurmanji Kurdish distinguishes between aspirated and unaspirated voiceless stops, which can be aspirated in all positions.

Dialect continuum 
Kurmanji forms a dialect continuum of great variability. Loosely, six subdialect areas can be distinguished:
 Northwestern Kurmanji, spoken in the Kahramanmaraş (in Kurmanji: Meraş), Malatya (Meletî) and Sivas (Sêwaz) provinces of the northwest of Turkish Kurdistan.
 Southwestern Kurmanji, spoken in the Adıyaman (Semsûr), Gaziantep (Entab) and Şanlıurfa (Riha) provinces of Turkish, and Aleppo Governorate in the west of Syrian Kurdistan.
 Northern Kurmanji or Serhed Kurdish, spoken mainly in the Ağrı (Agirî), Erzurum (Erzerom) and Muş (Mûş) provinces of the northeast of Turkish Kurdistan, as well as adjacent areas.
 Southern Kurmanji, spoken in Al-Hasakah Governorate in the east of Syrian Kurdistan, Sinjar District (Şingal) in the west of Iraqi Kurdistan, and in several adjacent parts of the south of Turkish Kurdistan, centered on the Mardin (Mêrdîn) and Batman (Êlih) provinces. 
 Southeastern Kurmanji or Badînî, spoken in Hakkâri Province (Parêzgeha Colêmêrgê) in the southeast of Turkish Kurdistan, and the Dohuk Governorate (Parêzgeha Dihokê) and parts of Erbil Governorate (Parêzgeha Hewlêr) in the north of Iraqi Kurdistan.
 Anatolian Kurmanji is spoken in Central Anatolia (Anatolya Navîn), especially in Konya, Ankara, and Aksaray, by Anatolian Kurds

Ezdîkî and Yazidi politics
Among some Yazidis, the glossonym Ezdîkî is used for Kurmanji to differentiate themselves from Kurds. While Ezdîkî is no different from Kurmanji, some attempt to prove that Ezdîkî is an independent language, including claims that it is a Semitic language. This has been criticized as not being based on scientific evidence and lacking scientific consensus.

On January 25, 2002, Armenia ratified the European Charter for Regional or Minority Languages and placed Kurdish under state protection. However, because of the divided Yazidi community in Armenia and after strong criticism from parts of the community, the authorities chose to ratify the charter by mentioning both "Kurdish" and "Yezidi" as two separate languages. This resulted in the term Êzdîkî being used by some researchers when delving into the question of minority languages in Armenia, since most Kurdish-speakers in Armenia are Yazidis. As a consequence of this move, Armenian universities offer language courses in both Kurmanji and Êzdîkî as two different dialects.

Kurmanji among other groups 
During the end of the Ottoman era, Assyrians in Tur Abdin shifted from speaking their traditional Turoyo language to either Kurmanji or Arabic. Kurdophone Armenians also exist and there were prior to the Armenian genocide around 110 Kurmanji-speaking Armenian villages in Beşiri and Silvan.

Bulgarian, Chechen and Circassian immigrants in Turkish Kurdistan also speak Kurmanji.

See also

 Kurdish alphabets
 Sorani
 Southern Kurdish
 Kurmancî, a Kurdish linguistic magazine

References

External links

  Wîkîferheng Kurdish (Kurmanji) Wiktionary
 Kurdish Institute Kurdish language, history, books and latest news articles.
 Egerîn, Kurdish (Kurmanji) search engine
 Reference Grammar with Selected Readings for Kurmanji Kurdish, written by W. M. Thackston (Harvard University)
 
Northern Kurdish (Kurmanji) DoReCo corpus  Audio recordings of narrative texts with transcriptions time-aligned at the phone level, translations, and time-aligned morphological annotations.

Languages of Armenia
Kurdish language
Languages of Iran
Languages of Turkey
Languages of Iraq
Languages of Syria
Languages of Azerbaijan
Languages of Georgia (country)
Languages of Lebanon
Languages of Jordan
Languages of Russia
Languages of Kazakhstan
Languages of Kyrgyzstan
Languages of Turkmenistan
Languages of Kurdistan